Tarika may refer to:

 Tarika (moth), a genus of moth
Tarika (musical group), musical group from Madagascar
Tariqah, school of Sufism